Unpaused is an Indian Hindi-language anthology film consisting of five short segments directed by Raj & DK, Nitya Mehra, Nikkhil Advani, Tannishtha Chatterjee and Avinash Arun. With an ensemble cast, the stories revolved around lives of people impacted by the COVID-19 pandemic. It premiered on 18 December 2020 on Amazon Prime Video.

Cast
Gulshan Devaiah as Ahan Awasthi
Sumeet Vyas as Sahil Khanna
Saiyami Kher as Ayesha Hussain
Richa Chadda as Devika Khanna
Abhishek Banerjee as Manish
Ratna Pathak Shah as Uma
Ishwak Singh as Chirag
Rinku Rajguru as Priyanka
Geetika Vidya Ohlyan as Seema
Lillete Dubey as Archna
Shardul Bharadwaj as Rafique (Auto Driver)

Critical reception
Debasree Purkayastha of The Hindu mentioned that the film has "a stirring ensemble of slice-of-life tales that dwell on the common themes of loneliness, love and hope." Saibal Chatterjee from NDTV wrote: "As a freewheeling rumination on loneliness, distress and lingering hope, the anthology, buoyed by a slew of terrific performances, is a pertinent commentary on a pandemic and its depredations."

Nandini Ramnath of Scroll.in praised the performances in the film but was critical of the treatment. Writing for The Indian Express, Shubhra Gupta noted that the film mixes different themes like loneliness and isolation "with news that has made headlines in this terrible virus-laden year, with average results." Anna M. M. Vetticad wrote: "Unpaused is important because it serves to chronicle this slice of history. It helps that it is also an enjoyable, insightful affair."

Soundtrack

The music was composed by Tanishk Bagchi, Payal Dev, Parth Parekh, Shishir A Samant and Gaurav Kadu  with lyrics written by Rashmi Virag, Kunaal Vermaa, Ginny Diwan, Traditional and Gaurav Kadu.

References

External links
 

2020 direct-to-video films
Indian anthology films
Amazon Prime Video original films
2020s Hindi-language films
Films directed by Raj Nidimoru and Krishna D.K.